The 2016–17 Stade Malherbe Caen season was the 104th season of the club since its creation in 1913, the 16th in Ligue 1.

Players

French teams are limited to four players without EU citizenship. Hence, the squad list includes only the principal nationality of each player; several non-European players on the squad have dual citizenship with an EU country. Also, players from the ACP countries—countries in Africa, the Caribbean, and the Pacific that are signatories to the Cotonou Agreement—are not counted against non-EU quotas due to the Kolpak ruling.

Current squad

As of 13 July 2016.

Out on loan

Transfers

Transfers in

Loans in

Transfers out

Loans out

Competitions

Ligue 1

League table

Results summary

Results by round

Matches

Coupe de France

Coupe de la Ligue

Goalscorers

References

Caen
2016